M & Co. is a graphic and product design firm. It is located in New York, New York, United States. Their designs are described by the Cooper-Hewitt, National Design Museum as being "imaginative and witty."

History

Tibor Kalman founded M & Co. with founding partners Carol Bokuniewicz and Liz Trovato in 1979. Despite studying journalism, he channeled his interest in typography and design to start M & Co. The company employed the likes of Stephen Doyle, Emily Oberman, Alexander Isley, Bethany Johns, and Marlene McCarty. Kalman's wife, Maira, was heavily involved in the organization and was a collaborator for many projects. In 1998 Maira Kalman became the principal member of M&Co which continues to produce design products today.

Projects

Major projects for M & Co. focused around stationery, ID systems, and media artwork, such as album covers. M & Co. also developed their own brand of watches and paperweights. They worked for clients such as: China Grill Management, Hannibal Records, Swatch, NYNEX, Benetton, and the Audubon Society. The company has also designed opening sequences for films such as The Silence of the Lambs, Something Wild, and True Stories.

Legacy

Works created by M & Co. are held in the collection of the Cooper-Hewitt, National Design Museum and the Museum of Modern Art.

References

Design companies of the United States
Defunct companies based in New York City
American companies established in 1979